Elizabeth "Bessie" Rockefeller (August 23, 1866 – November 14, 1906) was the eldest child of Standard Oil co-founder John Davison Rockefeller (1839–1937) and school teacher Laura Celestia "Cettie" Spelman (1839–1915).

Bessie Rockefeller was a special student at Vassar College 1886–1888.  Strong Hall, the school's first dormitory, was named in honor of Bessie in 1893 by her father who contributed $35,000 toward the expense of the construction.

On March 22, 1889, she married philosopher and psychologist Charles Augustus Strong and had one daughter, Margaret Rockefeller Strong (1897–1985).

She died on November 14, 1906 at age 40.

Further reading
Chernow, Ron. Titan: The Life of John D. Rockefeller Sr. London: Warner Books, 1998.
Stasz, Clarice. The Rockefeller Women: Dynasty of Piety, Privacy, and Service. New York: St. Martins Press. (1995).

See also
Rockefeller family
John D. Rockefeller

1866 births
1906 deaths
Rockefeller family
Vassar College alumni